The Suzuki TL1000S was a Suzuki V-twin roadster sport bike made from 1997–2001.

General background 
The Suzuki TL1000S was introduced by Suzuki in 1997 and was produced until 2001 and is frequently referred to as the TLS or Suzuki TLS. It is notable for the 90° V-twin engine which is still used in Suzuki's modern SV1000 and V-Strom 1000 motorcycles. 

The TLS motor featured a 90° V-twin for perfect primary balance and had hybrid chain/gear driven cams.  A traditional cam chain turned a gear that in turn rotated the cams.  This hybrid design eased maintenance immensely and gave the motor additional aural character because of the gear whine.  The motor was also used for the Suzuki TL1000R. Suzuki also sold many of the TL motors to Cagiva to be used in the Navigator and V-Raptor models.  Bimota also used the engine for their popular Bimota SB8K.

Rear shock 
Suzuki designers needed to find creative solutions to make the TL1000S a viable sportbike. V-twin engines are longer from front to rear than standard inline four cylinder motors used in most sportbikes. In order to keep the wheelbase as short as possible engineers separated the rear shock absorber/damper from the spring.  The spring was located on the right side of the bike and Suzuki developed and employed a rotary style rear damper that provided its damping characteristics through rotating arms. A similar version was also used on the Suzuki TL1000R. The rear shock was similar to suspension dampers used on Formula One race cars.
This 'rotary' damper was said to overheat the oil if the motorcycle was worked hard and became a source of concern to many but in real world road terms was reasonably ok. Many have now had this damperset up replaced with coil over shock units like 'Ohlins' etc

References

TL1000S
Sport bikes
Motorcycles introduced in 1997